The following is a list of songs recorded by the British boyband 911. The band has released three studio albums: The Journey, Moving On and There It Is, as well as two greatest hits compilations.

Unreleased songs

References

911